Hank Liotart (born November 15, 1943 in Baarn, Netherlands) is a Dutch-American former soccer player.  Liotart played one season in the National Professional Soccer League, eight in the North American Soccer League and at least one in Major Indoor Soccer League. He also played eight years in the Netherlands. Liotart earned four caps with the U.S. national team in 1975.

Professional
In 1964, Liotart signed with Blauw-Wit Amsterdam and spent three seasons in the Netherlands before returning to the U.S. When Liotart arrived in the U.S., he signed with the Pittsburgh Phantoms of the National Professional Soccer League (NPSL). The Phantoms folded at the end of the season and the NPSL merged with the United Soccer Association in 1968 to form the North American Soccer League (NASL). Liotart moved to the Cleveland Stokers for the 1968 NASL season. The Stokers folded at the end of the season and Liotart moved again, this time to the Dallas Tornado for the 1969 season. In 1970, he moved back to the Netherlands to sign with PEC Zwolle. In 1972, Zwolle transferred Liotart to N.E.C. Liotart left Nijmegen and returned to the U.S. in 1974. That year, the Seattle Sounders were an expansion team in the NASL. The team's coach John Best had played with Liotart in both Cleveland and Dallas and recruited him into the team. Liotart was a second team NASL All Star in 1974. He remained with the Sounders until 1976 when the team traded him to the Portland Timbers ten games into the season. That year, Liotart was invited to play for the U.S., actually an NASL all star team, in the Bicentennial Cup. In 1977, he played with Portland, then left the league for a season. In 1979, he signed with the San Diego Sockers for the 1979 and 1980 seasons. Liotart then played at least one season with the Memphis Americans of the Major Indoor Soccer League (MISL).  In 1982, he played for the Oklahoma City Slickers in the American Soccer League.

National team
Liotart earned four caps with the U.S. national team. His first game came in a 4-0 loss to Poland on June 24, 1975. He started, then came off for Dave D'Errico in the 67th minute. In August, the U.S. was invited to the Mexico City Tournament. Liotart played all three games in the tournament. His last cap came in the third game, a 2-0 loss to Mexico on August 24, 1975. He again started the game, but came off for Poli Garcia in the 71st minute.

Coaching
In 1980, Liotart coached the San Diego Sockers in the NASL.  He then coached the Hartford Hellions of MISL at some time in his career to a 3-9 record.

References

External links
 1974 Sounders profile
 Memphis Americans profile
 NASL/MISL stats

1943 births
Living people
American soccer coaches
American soccer players
American Soccer League (1933–1983) players
Cleveland Stokers players
Dallas Tornado players
Dutch footballers
Dutch expatriate footballers
Dutch emigrants to the United States
Dutch expatriate sportspeople in the United States
Eredivisie players
Expatriate soccer players in the United States
PEC Zwolle players
Hartford Hellions players
Major Indoor Soccer League (1978–1992) coaches
Major Indoor Soccer League (1978–1992) players
Memphis Americans players
NEC Nijmegen players
National Professional Soccer League (1967) players
North American Soccer League (1968–1984) coaches
North American Soccer League (1968–1984) players
North American Soccer League (1968–1984) indoor players
Oklahoma City Slickers (ASL) players
Pittsburgh Phantoms players
Portland Timbers (1975–1982) players
San Diego Sockers (NASL) players
Seattle Sounders (1974–1983) players
United States men's international soccer players
Wichita Wings (MISL) players
People from Baarn
Blauw-Wit Amsterdam players
Association football forwards
Association football midfielders
Footballers from Utrecht (province)
Naturalized citizens of the United States